A Man Called Ove is a 2015 Swedish comedy-drama film written and directed by Hannes Holm and based on the 2012 novel of the same name by Fredrik Backman. It stars Rolf Lassgård in the title role. 

The film was theatrically released in Sweden on 25 December 2015. It was nominated for six awards, winning two, at the 51st Guldbagge Awards in 2016. At the 89th Academy Awards, it was nominated for Best Foreign Language Film and Best Makeup and Hairstyling.

Plot
Ove Lindahl, a 59-year-old widower, lives in a townhouse neighborhood where he was the chairman of the neighborhood association until Rune, his former friend, replaced him. Rune is now paralysed after having a stroke and being cared for by his wife, Anita. Ove is depressed after his wife, Sonja, a schoolteacher, died from cancer six months previously. Having worked at the same company for 43 years, he is pushed into retiring. His attempts to hang himself are repeatedly interrupted by Iranian immigrant Parvaneh, her Swedish husband Patrick, and their two children, who are moving into the house across the street.

During another suicide attempt, Ove flashes back to his childhood. His mother died when he was a child, leaving him alone with his quiet father, a mechanic at the train company. His father shared his knowledge of engines with Ove, who had a part-time job at the train yard. Having done particularly well at his exams, he reports his results to his father, who is so anxious to spread the news that he fails to take proper care and is hit by a train and killed.

In the present, during another attempt to kill himself, this time by carbon monoxide poisoning, Ove is sitting in his running car and again recollects the past when he began working at the train company. Two men from the local council, whom Ove dubs "The Whiteshirts," arrive at young Ove's home and declare it should be demolished. Ove instead fixes the house. His neighbor's home catches fire one night, and Ove saves two people, but sparks from the fire cause his own home to burn, and The Whiteshirts prevent the fire from being tackled because they plan to demolish it in any case. 

With nowhere to go, Ove sleeps on a train at work; he wakes to find a young woman, Sonja, sitting across from him. He is smitten with her and returns to the same early train each morning. After three weeks, he finds her again, and they begin dating. She encourages him to return to school, and he earns a degree in engineering.

Ove's attempt to kill himself is interrupted by Parvaneh banging on the garage door, wanting a lift to the hospital because her husband has had an accident. Ove takes care of Parvaneh and Patrick's two daughters, Sepideh and Nasanin, and is made to sit outside after he causes a scene. Later, Ove goes to the train station, planning to jump in front of a train. However, when a man on the platform faints and falls onto the tracks, Ove jumps down and rescues him. 

Parvaneh asks Ove to teach her how to drive, and he eventually agrees. He also takes in a stray cat which he had previously found an annoyance. He tells Parvaneh about his past friendship with Rune and how they worked together to establish rules and order, with Ove as chairman of the neighborhood association board and Rune as the deputy chair. They grew apart over the years because Rune preferred Volvo cars and Ove Saabs until Rune organized a "coup" and replaced Ove as chairman. He also begins to bond with his new cat. He repairs a bike he confiscated from a neighborhood teen, Adrian, and returns it to Adrian, who works at a kebab shop with another youth called Mirsad. Ove notices Mirsad's eye makeup and wonders if he is "one of those gays" but does not shun him.

Despite his improved relations with his neighbors, Ove has an altercation with two "Whiteshirts" attempting to force Rune into a nursing home. Ove attempts suicide using a shotgun but is interrupted by Adrian and Mirsad ringing his doorbell. Adrian says Mirsad had been kicked out of his house after coming out to his family and needs a place to stay. Ove reluctantly invites Mirsad in. Later, Ove tells Parvaneh how, when pregnant, Sonja wanted to go on vacation before the baby arrived. She and Ove traveled on a tour bus to Spain, but on the journey home, the bus crashed. In the crash, Sonja lost the baby and her other injuries forced her to become reliant on a wheelchair, which made her unable to take a job as a teacher. When the local authorities ignored Ove's pleas to build a wheelchair ramp, he goes to the school at night and builds one.

Ove collapses and is taken to the hospital, where he lists Parvaneh as his next of kin. Parvaneh is told that her "father" has an enlarged heart but will survive. Laughing, she tells Ove he is terrible at dying before going into labor and delivering a boy. Ove gives gifts to Parvaneh's daughters, who refer to him as grandpa. 

Several months later, Parvaneh wakes to a winter storm and notices that the ever-punctual Ove has not cleared his pathway. She and Patrick run to Ove's house to find he has died. Ove, having found peace, has left strict instructions for his funeral; the service is packed with neighbors. The film ends with Ove waking on the train where he first met Sonja to find her waiting for him in the afterlife.

Cast

Reception

Critical response 
On review aggregator website Rotten Tomatoes, the film has an approval rating of 91% based on 117 reviews, with an average rating of 7.22/10. The website's critical consensus reads, "A Man Called Oves winsome sincerity — and Rolf Lassgård's affectingly flinty performance in the title role — keep it from succumbing to excess sentimentality." On Metacritic, which assigns a normalized rating to reviews, the film has a weighted average score of 70 out of 100, based on 21 critics, indicating "generally favorable reviews."

The Washington Post, Chicago Tribune and RogerEbert.com gave positive reviews. Reviewers have noted that while elements and formulas are familiar from films such as St. Vincent and Gran Torino, A Man Called Ove is well made and capable of bringing real tears to the audience's eyes.

, the film is the third most watched Swedish theatrical film in Sweden of all time.

Accolades

Remake

A US remake was produced by Tom Hanks, who stars in the film. In January 2022, it was announced that the film, titled A Man Called Otto, would be directed by Marc Forster, with David Magee writing the screenplay. Filming began in February 2022 in Pittsburgh with Mariana Treviño, Rachel Keller and Manuel Garcia-Rulfo co-starring alongside Hanks. In February 2022, Sony Pictures acquired worldwide distribution rights to the film for $60 million, the highest ever paid for a film at the European Film Market, and set it for a Christmas 2022 release.

See also
List of submissions to the 89th Academy Awards for Best Foreign Language Film
List of Swedish submissions for the Academy Award for Best Foreign Language Film

References

External links

 Master Class - A Man Called Otto w/ Tom Hanks, Rolf Lassgård, Rita Wilson, 2023 SF Studios video

2015 films
2015 comedy-drama films
Swedish comedy-drama films
Films based on Swedish novels
Films about widowhood
Films directed by Hannes Holm
Films scored by Gaute Storaas
Tre Vänner films
Films shot in Gothenburg
Films shot in Mallorca
Films shot in Stockholm
Films shot in Trollhättan
Films shot in Vänersborg
Nordisk Film films
2010s Swedish films